"Heart's on Fire" is a song by American rock singer John Cafferty. It was released in February 1986 as a single from the soundtrack to the film Rocky IV. The power ballad peaked at number 76 on the  Billboard Hot 100 chart. It was written by Vince DiCola, Ed Fruge, and Joe Esposito.

Critical reception 
Nancy Ehrlich of Billboard magazine reviewed called the song "high-adrenaline rock'n'roll over pummeling percussion."

Personnel 
 John Cafferty – vocals and guitar
 Gary Gramolini – lead guitar
 Pat Lupo – bass
 Kenny Jo Silva – drums
 Bobby Cotoia – keyboards
 Michael "Tunes" Antunes – saxophone
 Vince Dicola – keyboard

Charts

Certifications

References 

1985 songs
1986 singles
John Cafferty songs
Songs written by Vince DiCola
Rock ballads
Songs from Rocky (film series)